S. Murugaiyan (7 August 1920 - 6 January 2003) was an Indian politician, former Member of parliament, Lok Sabha and former Member of the Legislative Assembly of Tamil Nadu. He was elected to the Tamil Nadu legislative assembly from Thurinjapuram constituency in 1962 and from Kalasapakkam constituency as a Dravida Munnetra Kazhagam candidate in 1967, and 1971 elections.
He was also elected as Member of Parliament from Tirupattur constituency in 1980 lok sabha election.
He then served as Municipal Chairman of Tiruvannamalai and leader of Tiruvannamalai Sengunthar Mahajana sangam.

In Tiruvannamalai an educational institution was named as S. Murugaiyan memorial model high school.

References 

Tamil Nadu MLAs 1967–1972
Tamil Nadu MLAs 1971–1976